Florencio Horacio Troche Herrera (4 February 1935 – 14 July 2014) was a Uruguayan professional footballer who played as a defender.

Career
Born in Nueva Helvecia, Troche began playing football with local side Nacional de Nueva Helvecia as a central defender. Later, he would play for Club Nacional de Football and C.A. Cerro.

Troche moved abroad to play for Club Atlético Huracán in 1963 and again for one season in the Bundesliga for Alemannia Aachen in 1967.

Troche played 28 times for the Uruguay national team between 1959 and 1966, and featured at the 1962 World Cup in Chile and at the 1966 World Cup in England. Troche became noted when he, during the quarter final match against West Germany, got into a brawl with Uwe Seeler and boxed him on the ear. Uruguay lost the match 4–0.

After he retired from playing, Troche became a manager leading Mexican Primera División sides C.D. Guadalajara and Club de Fútbol Laguna.

References

External links

1935 births
2014 deaths
People from Nueva Helvecia
Uruguayan footballers
Uruguay international footballers
1962 FIFA World Cup players
1966 FIFA World Cup players
Uruguayan expatriate footballers
Uruguayan Primera División players
Argentine Primera División players
Bundesliga players
Club Nacional de Football players
C.A. Cerro players
Alemannia Aachen players
Bonner SC players
Expatriate footballers in Argentina
Expatriate footballers in Germany
Uruguayan football managers
C.D. Guadalajara managers
Copa América-winning players
Association football defenders